Otto Marcin Nikodym (3 August 1887 – 4 May 1974) (also Otton Martin Nikodým) was a Polish mathematician.

Education and career 
Nikodym studied mathematics at the University of Jan Kazimierz (UJK) in Lemberg (today's University of Lviv). Immediately after his graduation in 1911, he started his teaching job at a high school in Kraków where he remained until 1924. He eventually obtained his doctorate in 1925 from the University of Warsaw; he also spent an academic year (1926-1927) in Sorbonne. Nikodym taught at the Jagiellonian University in Kraków and University of Warsaw and at the Akademia Górnicza in Kraków in the years that followed. He moved to the United States in 1948 and joined the faculty of Kenyon College. He retired in 1966 and moved to Utica, New York, where he continued his research until retirement.

Personal life 
Nikodym was born in 1887 in Demycze, a suburb of Zabłotów (in modern day Ukraine), to a family with Polish, Czech, Italian and French roots. Orphaned at a young age, he was brought up by his maternal grandparents. In 1924, he married Stanisława Nikodym, the first Polish woman to obtain a PhD in mathematics.

Research works 
Nikodym worked in a wide range of areas, but his best-known early work was his contribution to the development of the Lebesgue–Radon–Nikodym integral (see Radon–Nikodym theorem). His work in measure theory led him to an interest in abstract Boolean lattices. His work after coming to the United States centered on the theory of operators in Hilbert space, based on Boolean lattices, culminating in his The Mathematical Apparatus for Quantum-Theories. He was also interested in the teaching of mathematics.

See also

 Nikodym set
 Radon–Nikodym theorem
 Radon–Nikodym property of a Banach space

References

External links
MacTutor Entry

1887 births
1974 deaths
University of Lviv alumni
University of Warsaw alumni
University of Paris alumni
Academic staff of Jagiellonian University
Academic staff of the University of Warsaw
Polish emigrants to the United States
Nikodym, Otto Martin
Kenyon College faculty
20th-century Polish mathematicians